Bannegon is a commune in the Cher department in the Centre-Val de Loire region of France.

Geography

Population

Places of interest
 The church of St.Sulpice, dating from the thirteenth century.
 The twelfth-century castle of Bannegon.

See also
Communes of the Cher department

References

Communes of Cher (department)